Franz Riegler (3 February 1922 – 15 February 1945) was an Austrian footballer who played as a forward and made two appearances for the Germany national team. He was also known as Franz Riegler II to distinguish him from his compatriot Franz "Bobby" Riegler of the same era.

Career
Riegler was able to represent Germany internationally following the Anschluss. He made his debut on 7 December 1941 in a friendly match against Slovakia, which finished as a 4–0 win for Germany. He earned his second and final cap on 18 January 1942 in a friendly against Croatia, which finished as a 2–0 win.

Personal life
During World War II, Riegler served in the Wehrmacht on the Eastern Front and in the Netherlands during 1942-43 until he was discharged after serving time in military prison at Gemersheim, Germany. Riegler died in an Allied bombing raid on 15 February 1945 in Vienna at the age of 23, and was buried on 23 February 1945 in the Großjedlersdorf cemetery in the same city.

Career statistics

International

References

External links
 
 
 

1922 births
1945 deaths
Austrian footballers
German footballers
Germany international footballers
Association football outside forwards
Association football inside forwards
FK Austria Wien players
Austrian civilians killed in World War II
Deaths by airstrike during World War II
German Army personnel of World War II
Austrian military personnel of World War II